= Umuehere, Port Harcourt =

Neighborhood of Port Harcourt in southeastern Nigeria

Coordinates: 4°52′27″N 7°02′08″E

Umuehere is a neighborhood of Port Harcourt in southeastern Nigeria, located on the north side of the city.
